A gaming computer, also known as a gaming PC, is a specialized personal computer designed for playing video games at high standards. Gaming PCs typically differ from mainstream personal computers by using high-performance video cards, a high core-count central processing units with raw performance and higher-performance RAM. Gaming PCs are also used for other demanding tasks such as video editing.
Gamers and computer enthusiasts may choose to overclock their CPUs and GPUs in order to gain extra performance. The added power draw needed to overclock either processing units often requires additional cooling, usually by air cooling or water cooling.

65.1 million gaming products have been sold overall as of 2021, of which 27.9 million are gaming notebooks, 19.7 million are gaming monitors, and 17.5 million are gaming desktops.

History 
The Nimrod, designed by John Makepeace Bennett, built by Raymond Stuart-Williams and exhibited in the 1951 Festival of Britain, is considered to be the first gaming computer to ever be conceived. Bennett did not intend for it to be a real gaming computer, however, as it was supposed to be an exercise in mathematics as well as to prove computers could "carry out very complex practical problems", not purely for enjoyment.

Few years later, game consoles like the Magnavox Odyssey (released in 1972) and the Atari 2600 (released 1977) were the basis of the future of not just gaming consoles, but gaming computers as well with their increasing popularity with families everywhere. The first "modern" computer was made in 1942, the Atanasoff–Berry Computer (ABC for short). Unlike modern desktops and laptops, the ABC was a gargantuan machine that occupied "1,800 square feet… weighing almost 50 tons", . When the Apple II and the Commodore 64 released in 1977 and 1982 respectively, personal computers became more appealing for general consumer use.

However, their overall computing power, efficiency, and compact size was more advanced from even the most advanced computers at the time.

Today, many companies and manufacturers offer gaming computers in a variety of configurations. For instance, Dell has their gaming computer division, Alienware, which formed in 1997, HP with their OMEN division, whose lineage dates back to 1991 under the defunct brand VoodooPC, Lenovo with their Legion PCs, Asus with their own TUF and ROG PCs, Acer with their special product lines, and Predator, that coexist with the rest of their line-up, and more other brands. These brands aim for affordability, features, build-quality, performance, or a mixture of these for marketing.

Hardware 

The Commodore 64 was the most powerful computer for its time in 1982, featuring an MOS Technology 6510 CPU with 64 kb of RAM. It could display up to "40 columns and 25 lines of text" along with 16 colors on its 320x200 resolution screen. Over time, technology progressed to where these specifications became outdated and computer hardware continued to evolve than what was possible before. Today, many modern general-purpose use computers have basic specifications for the average user, such as a Lenovo Chromebook C340-11, which as 4 GB of RAM, 64 GB of internal storage, a dedicated graphics card, Intel Celeron N4000, and has a 1366x768 resolution screen with some variants offering touch screen capabilities. Gaming computers have much more advanced specifications such as the Alienware Area-51M R2 Gaming Laptop, which features the latest Intel Core i9 processor with 10 cores, a dedicated graphics card with 8 GB of VRAM, 16 GB of RAM, and 512 GB of internal storage. Gaming laptops generally do not offer touch screen displays, since they require a large portion of energy to run which in turn can affect the speed and frame-rate of the game.

Form factors 

Senior editor of Tom's Hardware Andrew Freedman says that "Gaming rigs aren't one-size fits all", and that there are certain instances where a gaming desktop will be more appropriate than a laptop and other circumstances where a laptop is more appropriate than a desktop. Each platform has its pros and cons, which may change depending on a person's needs. 

For example, someone looking for maximum portability may choose a laptop over a desktop since it is all self-contained in one unit, whereas a desktop setup is split up into multiple components: a monitor, keyboard, mouse, and the desktop itself. Freedman states that laptops are ideal candidates for LAN parties, especially ones equipped with "Nvidia's Max-Q GPUs" which "can easily fit into a backpack and don't pack outrageously large chargers".

Upgradeability is another category many PC gamers consider when deciding between a laptop and a desktop. As Freedman states, "you can't build a laptop on your own", as the usable space inside a laptop is much more limited compared to a desktop. There are also fewer items that can be changed out on a laptop than a desktop, like RAM and storage, compared to a desktop where almost all the components, including motherboards and CPUs, can be swapped out with the latest technology available at the time. The only exception is pre-built desktops, which can use "proprietary motherboards that aren't standard sizes". These uniquely shaped motherboards can limit the owner's capability to upgrade components in the future, but they can still generally change out "the RAM, GPU and… CPU". 

Another major category PC gamers consider is the cost. Freedman did a basic comparison between two similarly equipped computers, one a laptop and one a desktop. Both had the similar CPUs (an Intel Core I5), GPUs (Nvidia GeForce GTX 1660s except the laptop's was a compact version that could fit within the case), and RAM, but the laptop was $200 more expensive than the desktop and nearly half as much memory as the desktop. The SSD (or solid-state drive) in the laptop is faster than a regular hard-drive though and gaming laptops are ready to start playing once they are configured, whereas desktop PC gamers have to make additional purchases if they only have the computer, not the accessories. 

People usually buy gaming PCs because they want the performance that is expected to them. The majority of this potential lies in the parts of desktops, which can be overclocked for more performance as well as being able to with stand abuse because of their higher durability. Freedman also states that desktops have "a bigger chassis", which allows for "more fans…for better cooling and heat dissipation", which ultimately leads to stronger performance.

Build types 

As stated before, there are options PC gamers take into account when deciding to build their own unit versus buying a pre-built one. There are not many options when it comes to the laptop configuration but they do exist. Jason Clarke, a contributor to Chillblast, points out that there are a number of builders that deal specifically with laptops with some adding configurable features that were not originally so, such as being able to change CPUs and GPUs. It is important to note that these PC builders build from scratch and the possibility to change out CPUs and GPUs after they have been installed is unlikely. Clarke also advises that people should and cannot build their own laptops because of how complex and compact everything is. 

Many PC gamers and journalists, like Clarke and Freedman, advise people to start with gaming desktops as they are the way to go when seeking pure performance. Pre-built desktops like Alienware's Aurora R11 are ready-to-go systems with a history behind them, but some claim that their systems are over-priced. This is mainly due to the cost of building the PC and ease of access for components for the consumer. Marshall Honorof, a writer for Tom's Guide, explains that the steps on how to build a gaming PC from scratch "can be a daunting process, particularly for newcomers" but it could be one of the best technological decisions someone can make. According to his research, Honorof found that $1,500 is enough to buy a "powerful, but not quite top-of-the-line" computer and one can choose his or her own components.

See also 
 Enthusiast computing
 Mobile workstation
 PC game
 PC Master Race
 Steam Deck
 Workstation

References

External links 

Personal computers
Video game hardware